The BMW iX3 is a battery electric compact luxury crossover SUV manufactured by BMW. It was presented at the 2018 Beijing Motor Show in April as the battery electric version of the BMW X3 (G01). Built on the same platform as the conventional X3 with only subtle changes, it is the third car of the electric-focused BMW i family and the first battery electric BMW SUV.

Overview 
The production version of the BMW iX3 was unveiled in July 2020.

The iX3 was released to customers in 2021. Production began in September 2020 at BMW's factory in Dadong, Shenyang China. It will not be available in the United States and Canada, reportedly due to the vehicle's limited range and sole rear-wheel-drive configuration.

It features adaptive flat LED headlights, 19-inch bi-color wheels, three-dimensional LED taillights, it also features a BMW Live Cockpit Professional along with a 12-inch digital display and a 12-inch central touch screen and leather seats.

Powertrain 
The electric powertrain is BMW's fifth-generation scalable electric drivetrain that is distinguished by a more compact design than that used by the existing BMW i3 with the electric motor, transmission, and power electrics grouped together in a single component. It does not feature rare-earth materials in its construction and allows BMW to significantly reduce production costs over the old model.

The batteries consists of 188 prismatic cells and are positioned on the floor, lowering the centre of gravity by 75 mm. It has  of boot space,  smaller than in a conventional X3.

References

External links 
 

IX3
G08
Cars introduced in 2018
Rear-wheel-drive vehicles
Production electric cars
Luxury sport utility vehicles
Luxury crossover sport utility vehicles
IX3
BMW concept vehicles
Electric concept cars